Yaro were one of the native nations of Uruguay and Argentina (Entre Ríos). A minor tribe, they were closely related to the Charrúa people.

Nowadays a street in Montevideo (Cordón neighbourhood) bears their name.

References

External links
  

Indigenous peoples in Argentina
Indigenous peoples in Uruguay
History of Uruguay
Indigenous peoples of the Southern Cone